Magdaléna Vášáryová (referred also as Magda Vášáryová ; born 26 August 1948) is a Slovak actress and diplomat, prominent for her liberal anti-nationalist stances.

Life 
Vášáryová was born in 1948. In 1971, she completed her studies at Comenius University in Bratislava. Until 1989, she acted in several Slovak theatres, including Slovak National Theatre, and in numerous movies. She was ambassador of Czechoslovakia in Austria (1990-1993) and ambassador of Slovakia in Poland (2000-2005). She was one of the candidates in the 1999 presidential election, but did not advance to the second round of the election. From February 2005 to July 2006, she held the position of State Secretary of the Ministry of Foreign Affairs of Slovakia. In the 2006 parliamentary elections, she was elected to the National Council of the Slovak Republic for Slovak Democratic and Christian Union - Democratic Party.

She was considered for the role of Sophie in Sophie's Choice.

In 2016, Vášáryová was awarded by the Prague Society for International Cooperation for fighting communism and corruption during her whole career with the Hanno R. Ellenbogen Citizenship Award.

The entrepreneur Michal Horáček stood to be President of the Czech republic. He announced his advisers on 9 February 2017 which included Vášáryová, nuclear expert Dana Drábová, and surgeon Pavel Pafko.

Private life 
In 1980, she married Milan Lasica a Slovak humorist, playwright and actor. They were married until his death of heart attack on July 18, 2021.

Filmography 

Senzi mama (1964) (TV) .... Eva
Marketa Lazarová (1967) .... Marketa Lazarová
Zbehovia a pútnici (1968) .... Dominika - Dominika
Sladký čas Kalimagdory (1968) .... Kalimagdora
Kráľovská poľovačka (1969) .... Marta za mlada
Birds, Orphans and Fools (1969) .... Marta
Na kometě (1970) .... Angelika
Radúz a Mahulena (1970) (TV) .... Mahulena
The Tricky Game of Love (1971) .... Náušnice - služka
Princ Bajaja (1971) .... Slavěna
Babička (1971) (TV) .... Hortensie
And Give My Love to the Swallows (1972) .... Maruška
Skrytý prameň (1974) .... Mária
Deň slnovratu (1974) .... Blanka
Rusalka (1977) .... Rusalka
Krutá ľúbosť (1978) .... 2. - Kristka
Pustý dvor (1978) .... Kristina
Temné slunce (1980) .... Kris
Zkrocení zlého muže (1981) .... Tereza
Cutting It Short (1981) .... Maryška
The Night of the Emerald Moon (1984) .... Slávka
Tichá radosť (1985) .... Soňa
Lev s bílou hřívou (1986) .... Calma Veselá
Svět nic neví (1987) .... Jiřina
Južná pošta (1987) .... Mária Jurkovičová
Eugene Onegin (1988) .... Tatyana

Family 
sister of actress Emília Vášáryová
wife of comedian and writer Milan Lasica

References

External links 

Profile as a 2006 election candidate 
 

1948 births
Living people
People from Banská Štiavnica
Slovak Democratic and Christian Union – Democratic Party politicians
Slovak film actresses
Ambassadors of Czechoslovakia to Austria
Ambassadors of Slovakia to Poland
Candidates for President of Slovakia
Slovak women diplomats
Czechoslovak women diplomats
Women ambassadors
Slovak stage actresses
Slovak television actresses
Members of the National Council (Slovakia) 2006-2010
Members of the National Council (Slovakia) 2010-2012
21st-century Slovak women politicians
Members of the National Council (Slovakia) 2012-2016
Female members of the National Council (Slovakia)
20th-century Slovak actresses